Svend Erik Kehler Christensen (born 17 March 1949) is a Danish former footballer who played as a midfielder. He played in four matches for the Denmark national team from 1975 to 1977.

References

External links
 
 

1949 births
Living people
Danish men's footballers
Association football midfielders
Denmark international footballers
Denmark youth international footballers
Denmark under-21 international footballers
Næstved Boldklub players
People from Svendborg Municipality
Sportspeople from the Region of Southern Denmark